Chabi Mama (15 July 1921 – 10 May 1996 or 2001) was an early Beninese politician. He became the foreign minister of newly independent Dahomey (now Benin) in 1959, lasting in that position until 1960. He then returned to that position from 1963 to 1964.

References

1921 births
2001 deaths
People of French West Africa
Foreign ministers of Benin
People from Parakou
20th-century Beninese politicians